Niyamam Enthucheyyum is a 1990 Indian Malayalam-language film directed by Arun, starring Shankar.

Cast

Shankar
Ratheesh as S.I. 
Adoor Bhasi
Nalini
Shanavas as Prakash
Prameela as Prameela
Kuthiravattam Pappu
Kaduvakulam Antony
Prathapachandran as Kaimal
Lalithasree
Priya as Priya
Kuyili 
Ramu 
T. G. Ravi as Sathyapal

References

External links
 

1990 films
1990s Malayalam-language films